Battle of Majuba Hill, the final and decisive battle of the First Boer War
 Majuba Day, a major annual national celebration on 27 February in the South African Republic
 Majuba: Heuwel van Duiwe (Majuba: Hill of Pigeons), a 1968 South African War drama film based on the battle that was directed by David Millin
 Majuba Mountains, a mountain range in Pershing County, Nevada
 Majuba Power Station, coal-fired power plant in Mpumalanga, South Africa